Smith-Short and Willin Ditch is a  long 1st order tributary to Gravelly Branch in Sussex County, Delaware.

Course
Smith-Short and Willin Ditch rises about 3 miles east-northeast of Gully Camp, Delaware, and then flows south to join Gravelly Branch about 1.5 miles northeast of Coverdale Crossroads.

Watershed
Smith-Short and Willin Ditch drains  of area, receives about 45.1 in/year of precipitation, has a wetness index of 705.08, and is about 17% forested.

See also
List of rivers of Delaware

References

Rivers of Delaware
Rivers of Sussex County, Delaware